Fillmore East, February 1970 is a live album by the rock group the Allman Brothers Band. It was recorded by Owsley Stanley at the Fillmore East in Manhattan on February 11, 13, and 14, 1970. It was released on CD in 1996.

In 2018, the album was remastered and rereleased by the Owsley Stanley Foundation, with the title Bear's Sonic Journals: Fillmore East, February 1970.  There are two different versions of this release.  One contains the same material as the original album.  The other is the Deluxe Edition, on three CDs, with two discs containing all the music that was captured on tape at the concerts.

The February 1970 concerts

On February 11, 13, and 14, 1970, the Allman Brothers Band, along with the Grateful Dead and Love, played at Bill Graham's Fillmore East auditorium in New York City.  The performances were taped by the Grateful Dead's sound engineer, Owsley ("Bear") Stanley.

Fillmore East, February 1970 is composed of selections from those concerts.  The album was produced by Stanley, who also wrote the liner notes.  It was mastered by the Dead's recording engineer, Jeffrey Norman.  It was released on the Grateful Dead label, in cooperation with the Allman Brothers' record company at the time, PolyGram Records.

Performances by the Grateful Dead from the same set of shows have been released on two albums – Bear's Choice, and Dick's Picks Volume 4.

Critical reception

On AllMusic, Lindsay Planer wrote, "There is no mistaking the unbridled fervor of the original line-up of the band. Rising to the challenge of exploratory psychedelia – while remaining ever faithful to their Southern blues roots...  Likewise, the Allman Brothers were beginning to ascend as not only premier interpreters, but purveyors of a revolutionary new electric guitar-driven blues movement".

In The Music Box, John Metzger said, "... the disc opens with a scorching rendition of "In Memory of Elizabeth Reed" that simply grooves. Dickey Betts and Duane Allman are magnificent, as they play with reckless abandon, yet tightly in synch. The highlight of this album, however, is the nearly 31-minute "Mountain Jam" that drips with a colorfully electrified intensity."

In Glide Magazine, Doug Collette wrote, "Almost a year after the formation of the seminal Southern rock band... the original sextet was homing in on the sound that would lend itself to At Fillmore East, the epic recordings done thirteen months later at the same venue. Yet even as the group... was honing the influential  style that would make them famous, they were stretching themselves as well, shuffling novel and well-established material in and out of their repertoire."

Track listing

Original album

Deluxe Edition

Note: "Discs 2 & 3 contain the sonic journal reels of the three shows as recorded each night, unaltered.  Portions from these three chapters were used to create the compilation album (disc 1)."

Personnel
The Allman Brothers Band
Duane Allman – lead and slide guitars
Gregg Allman – vocals, Hammond B-3 Organ
Dickey Betts – lead guitar
Berry Oakley – bass, vocals on "Hoochie Coochie Man"
Jaimoe – drums, percussion
Butch Trucks – drums, tympani
Production
Owsley Stanley – producer, sound recording
Jeffrey Norman – digital editing
John Chester, Jamie Howarth, Plangent Processes – tape to digital transfer and speed correction
Dick Latvala – tape archivist and facilitator
Kirk West – associate producer and logistical coordinator
Bob Johnson – photos
Gecko Graphics – design

References

Live at the Fillmore East albums
1996 live albums
The Allman Brothers Band live albums